Utatane is the first album from the Japanese duo RYTHEM, released in 2004.

Track listing
"風船雲" (Fuusen Kumo) Balloon Cloud (4:02) 
"ハルモニア" (HARUMONIA) Harmonia (4:16)
"一人旅シャラルラン" (Hitoritabi Shararuran) Travelling Alone (4:36)
"万華鏡キラキラ" (Mangekyou KIRAKIRA) Sparkly Kaleidoscope (4:32)
"Circulate" (4:37)
"小麦色のラブソング" (Komugiiro no RABUSONGU) Love Song of Cocoa Brown (6:18)
"EVERY" (4:53)
"てんきゅっ" (Tenkyu) Thank You (4:05)
"ブルースカイ・ブルー" (BURU- SUKAI BURU-) Blue Sky Blue (3:21)
"青春時代" (Seishun Jidai) Youthful Days (4:59)
"女友達" (Onna Tomodachi) Girlfriend (4:35)
"ラプンツェル" (RAPUNSHERU) Rapunzel (5:03)
"自由詩" (Jiyuu Shi) Freedom Poem (6:09)

External links
RYTHEM Official Web Site (Japanese)
Utatane Lyrics

2004 albums
Rythem albums